Georges Joseph Dufour (1758-1820) was a French Republican and military commander during the French Revolutionary and Napoleonic wars.

Biography

Dufour was born at Saint-Seine in France in 1758, and joined the military at Nivernais.  He fought at Verdun in 1792, and joined a number of officers refusing to sign the capitulation.  He also fought at Battle of Neerwinden, at Namurs, and participated in the suppression of the anti-revolutionary uprising in the Vendée. He was present when the French Army overwhelmed Mannheim in 1795, and was wounded, then captured, by the Austrian Army at the Battle of Handschuhsheim.  He continued to fight in the imperial army until 1809. He retired to Bordeaux, but returned to the military during the Hundred Days in 1815.  He was detained briefly following Napoleon's final defeat.  He died in Bordeaux in 1820.

References

Citations

Bibliography
  Feller, François-Xavier Feller, François Marie Pérennès, Biographie universelle, ou Dictionnaire historique des hommes qui se sont fait un nom par leur talens, leur génie....  Paris: Éditeurs Gauthier frères, 1834. Volume 4.
 

1820 deaths
1758 births
Military leaders of the French Revolutionary Wars
French commanders of the Napoleonic Wars
People from Nièvre
Names inscribed under the Arc de Triomphe